Mișu Popp (March 19, 1827 – March 6, 1892) was a Romanian painter and muralist.

Biography
Born in Brașov, in the Principality of Transylvania, he was the eighth child of Ioan Popp Moldovan de Galați (1774–1869) and Elena (1783–1867), born Ivan, a family from the Făgăraș region.  His father was a church muralist, painter and sculptor.

Popp finished his art studies in 1848, at the Academy of Fine Arts from Vienna, where he developed a serious academic style.

He carried on the work of his father by painting several churches from Bucharest, Brașov (Tocile, Saint Nicholas Church), Araci, Râșnov, Satulung, Târgu-Jiu, Câmpulung, Urlați, etc. Between 1847 and 1853 he painted with Constantin Lecca the church of Curtea Veche from Bucharest.

But his main art legacy resides in creating many portraits of the personalities of his time (Ion Heliade Rădulescu, Andrei Mureșanu, Vasile Alecsandri, etc.) and of some famous historical figures, such as Michael the Brave, inspired from a contemporary engraving of the voivode.

His paintings are displayed in Bucharest at the Romanian Literature Museum and the National Art Museum, as well as in museums in Arad, Brașov, Ploiești, and Sibiu. A street in Râșnov bears his name. He is buried in Brașov’s Groaveri cemetery.

Gallery
Click on an image to view it enlarged.

Notes

External links 

  Art Museum from Brașov – Mișu Popp
  Compendium – Mișu Popp
  Art gallery – Mișu Popp
  Famous people from Brașov – Mișu Popp
  Elena Popescu – The portraits of Mișu Popp in the art collection of Brukental Art Museum from Sibiu
  Exhibition "Princes of the Romanian Principalities" 

1827 births
1892 deaths
People from Brașov
Romanians in Hungary
Members of the Romanian Orthodox Church
19th-century Romanian painters
Romanian muralists
Academy of Fine Arts Vienna alumni
Burials at Groaveri cemetery